The Battle of Lule Burgas or Battle of Luleburgas – Bunarhisar was a battle between the Kingdom of Bulgaria and the Ottoman Empire and was the bloodiest battle of the First Balkan War. The battle took place from 28 October to 2 November 1912. The outnumbered Bulgarian forces made the Ottomans retreat to Çatalca line, 30 km from the Ottoman capital Constantinople. In terms of forces engaged it was the largest battle fought in Europe between the end of the Franco-Prussian War and the beginning of the First World War.

Battle

Following the quick Bulgarian victory on the Petra – Seliolu – Geckenli line and the capture of Kirk Kilisse (Kırklareli), the Ottoman forces retreated in disorder to the east and south. The Bulgarian Second Army under the command of gen. Nikola Ivanov besieged Adrianople (Edirne) but the First and Third armies failed to chase the retreating Ottoman forces. Thus the Ottomans were allowed to re-group and took new defensive positions along the Lule Burgas – Bunar Hisar line. The Bulgarian Third Army under gen. Radko Dimitriev reached the Ottoman lines on 28 October. The attack began the same day by the army's three divisions – 5th Danubian Infantry Division (commander major-gen. Pavel Hristov) on the left flank, 4th Preslav Infantry Division (major-gen. Kliment Boyadzhiev) in the centre and 6th Bdin Infantry Division (major-gen. Pravoslav Tenev) on the right flank. By the end of the day the 6th Division captured the town of Lule Burgas. With the arrival of the First Army on the battlefield the following day, attacks continued along the entire front line but were met with fierce resistance and even limited counter-attacks by the Ottomans. Heavy and bloody battles occurred on the next two days and the casualties were high on both sides. At the cost of heavy losses, the Bulgarian Fourth and 5th Division managed to push the Ottomans back and gained 5 km of land in their respective sectors of the frontline on 30 October.

The Bulgarians continued to push the Ottomans on the entire front. The 6th division managed to breach the Ottoman lines on the right flank. After another two days of fierce combat, the Ottoman defence collapsed and on the night of 2 November the Ottoman forces began a full retreat along the entire frontline. The Bulgarians again didn't immediately follow the retreating Ottoman forces and lost contact with them, which allowed the Ottoman army to take up positions on the Çatalca defence line just 30 km west of Constantinople.

There were a large number of journalists who reported on the Battle of Lule Burgas, whose accounts provide rich details about this event.

Footnotes

Sources

 
 

Lule Burgas
Lule Burgas
1912 in the Ottoman Empire
Lule Burgas 1912
Lule Burgas 1912
Adrianople vilayet
History of Kırklareli Province
October 1912 events
November 1912 events